Richard Vasgaard is an American politician. He has served as a Republican member for the 17th district in the South Dakota House of Representatives since January 12, 2021.  Vasgaard is a farmer and received a bachelor's degree in agronomy from South Dakota State University.

Election history
2020     Vasgaard was elected with 4,786 votes; Sydney Davis was also elected with 5,278 votes.  They defeated Al Leber who received 3,645 votes and Caitlin Collier who received 3,181 votes.

Personal life
He is married to Joyce and has a son, Thomas.

References

Living people
Republican Party members of the South Dakota House of Representatives
South Dakota State University alumni
21st-century American politicians
Year of birth missing (living people)